4020 may refer to:

4020 Dominique
John Deere 4020, a farm tractor
ÖBB 4020, an electric train by ÖBB
A 40/20 kick in rugby league
The year in the 5th millennium